Christmas with Boney M. is a Christmas compilation by Boney M., released on 16 November 2007. It is a reissue of The 20 Greatest Christmas Songs with a reordered tracklist that restores the two songs from the original Christmas Album which were originally excluded, and a 2007 recording by the Daddy Cool Kids as a bonus track. This compilation follows the 2007 re-release of Boney M.'s original studio albums.

In Canada, the release of this album by Sony BMG Music (Canada) Inc. does not include the last two tracks, tracks 18 and 19.

Track listing
"Mary's Boy Child – Oh My Lord" (Jester Hairston, Lorin, Frank Farian, Fred Jay) – 5:09
1981 edit
"When a Child Is Born" (Fred Jay, Zacar) – 3:20   
"White Christmas" (Irving Berlin) – 3:21
 1982 edit 
"Feliz Navidad" (José Feliciano) – 2:21
 1986 remix  
"Jingle Bells" (James Lord Pierpont, Frank Farian) – 3:28
 1986 remix
"Zion's Daughter (Tochter Zion)" (Traditional, George Frideric Handel, Frank Farian, Fred Jay, Helmut Rulofs) – 3:51 
 1986 remix
"Darkness Is Falling" (Fred Jay, Helmut Rulofs) – 3:02   
 1986 remix
"Hark the Herald Angels Sing" (Felix Mendelssohn, Charles Wesley, Farian) – 3:03 
 recorded 1984
"Little Drummer Boy" (Katherine K. Davis, Henry Onorati, Harry Simeone) – 4:27
"The First Noel" (Traditional) – 3:03
 recorded 1984
"Oh Christmas Tree" (Traditional, Farian) – 2:57 
 recorded 1984 
"I'll Be Home for Christmas" (Catherine Courage, Frank Farian, Helmut Rulofs) – 3:54
"Oh Come All Ye Faithful" (John Francis Wade, Farian) – 3:41   
 recorded 1984
"Petit Papa Noël" (Martinet, Vincy) – 1:41 
"Winter Fairy-Tale" (Instrumental) (Baierl) – 2:58  
"Joy to the World" (Lowell Mason, Isaac Watts) – 2:32  
 recorded 1984
"Auld Lang Syne" (Robert Burns) – 2:34
 recorded 1984
Christmas Medley: "Silent Night, Holy Night (Stille Nacht, Heilige Nacht)"/ "Snow Falls Over the Ground (Leise Rieselt Der Schnee)" / "Hear Ye the Message" / "Sweet Bells (Süßer die Glocken nie klingen)" (Franz Xaver Gruber, Joseph Mohr, Eduard Ebel, Traditional, Frank Farian, Fred Jay) – 7:51
 1986 version
"Mary's Boy Child" / "Oh My Lord" – 4:45
 new recording 2007 by Daddy Cool Kids

Personnel
 Liz Mitchell – lead vocals
 Marcia Barrett – backing vocals
 Reggie Tsiboe – lead vocals on "Joy to the World", "The First Noel", "Auld Lang Syne", backing vocals (1984 recordings)
 Frank Farian – lead vocal on "I'll Be Home for Christmas", backing vocals
 The Christmas Choir from London – backing vocals (1981 recordings)
 Amy & Elaine Goff – lead vocals on "Oh Come All Ye Faithful", backing vocals (1984 recordings)

Charts

Certifications

References

2007 Christmas albums
Christmas albums by German artists
Albums produced by Frank Farian
2007 compilation albums
Christmas compilation albums
Boney M. compilation albums